Os Afro-sambas is a 1966 studio album (that should not be confused with the album of the same name and different artwork recorded live) by Baden Powell and Vinícius de Moraes. The live album is ranked number 29 on Rolling Stone's list of 100 Greatest Brazilian Albums.

Background
Considered a watershed (the original live recording) in MPB for fusing various elements of African sound with samba, Os Afro-sambas was recorded by Baden Powell, Vinícius de Moraes, and Quarteto em Cy in 1966.

In the mid-1960s Vinícius was fascinated by an LP of samba de roda songs with candomblé influences from Bahia. Baden Powell had also gone to Bahia and heard the songs of the Bahian candomblé. From this mutual enchantment with samba and religiosity found in Bahia, the Afro-sambas project emerged. The eight songs (11 in the live show) have a rich and unique musicality: a mix of candomblé and umbanda instruments (like atabaques and afoxés) with timbres common to Brazilian music (agogôs, saxophones and tambourines).

The opening track, Canto de Ossanha is ranked number 9 on Rolling Stone's list of 100 greatest Brazilian songs.

Baden Powell re-recorded this album in 1990 (and many other times in and right after 1966) again accompanied by Quarteto em Cy, but this time singing the lead vocal himself, Vinícius having died.

Track listing
All tracks are jointly authored by Baden Powell and Vinícius de Moraes.
 "Canto de Ossanha" - 03:23
 "Canto de Xangô" - 06:28
 "Bocoché" - 02:34
 "Canto de Iemanjá" - 04:47
 "Tempo de amor" - 04:28
 "Canto do Caboclo Pedra-Preta" - 03:39
 "Tristeza e solidão" - 04:35
 "Lamento de Exu" - 02:16

Personnel
 Vocals - Vinícius de Moraes, Quarteto em Cy and mixed choir
 Guitar - Baden Powell
 Flute - Nicolino Copia
 Tenor saxophone - Pedro Luiz de Assis
 Baritone saxophone - Aurino Ferreira
 Double bass - Jorge Marinho
 Drums - Reisinho
 Atabaque - Alfredo Bessa
 Little atabaque - Nelson Luiz
 Bongô - Alexandre Silva Martins
 Pandeiro - Gilson de Freitas
 Agogô - Mineirinho
 Afoxé - Adyr José Raimundo
 Arrangements and musical direction - Guerra Peixe
 Production and artistic direction - Roberto Quartin and Wadi Gebara Netto
 Recording technician - Ademar Rocha
 Photos - Pedro de Moraes
 Cover - Goebel Weyne
 Liner notes - Vinícius de Moraes

References 

1966 albums
Vinicius de Moraes albums
Samba albums